Er Chanyu (r. 105-102 BC), born Wushilu, was a chanyu of the Xiongnu Empire. He succeeded his father Wuwei Chanyu in 105 BC and died from an illness in 102 BC. Er Chanyu was succeeded by his uncle, Xulihu Chanyu.

In the summer of 103 BC, Zhao Ponu attacked the Xiongnu with 20,000 cavalry, but was surrounded and captured. The Xiongnu tried to take a Han stronghold after the victory but failed.

Footnotes

References
Bichurin N.Ya., "Collection of information on peoples in Central Asia in ancient times", vol. 1, Sankt Petersburg, 1851, reprint Moscow-Leningrad, 1950 (Shiji ch. 110, Qian Han Shu ch. 94a) 

Chanyus
2nd-century BC rulers in Asia
102 BC